The TE-416 Tomahawk is a rocket developed by the American company Thiokol at the beginning of the 1960s for Sandia National Laboratories. Although the TE-416 Tomahawk can be launched alone, it was started predominantly as upper stage in connection with other rockets, for example with a Nike rocket as first stage (Nike Tomahawk).

References

External links
http://www.designation-systems.net/dusrm/app4/tomahawk.html

Rockets and missiles

es:Misil Tomahawk